Peraclidae is a family of pelagic sea snails or "sea butterflies", marine gastropod mollusks in the superfamily Cymbulioidea.

This family has no subfamilies (according to the taxonomy of the Gastropoda by Bouchet & Rocroi, 2005).

This family was originally called Procymbuliidae Tesch, 1913 and then called Peraclididae by Wenz in 1938. The name Peraclidae takes precedence.

Peracle is the type genus of the family Peraclidae.

"Peraclis" Pelseener, 1888 is a unjustied modification (Giovine, F. 1988)

Description 
The left-coiled shell resembles the shell of most snails. The columella is somewhat elongated into a curved rostrum. There is an operculum and a gill.

Species 
Species within the genus Peracle Forbes, 1844 include:

 † Peracle charlotteae Janssen & Little, 2010
 Peracle depressa Meisenheimer, 1906 - Distribution: Cuba, Brazil, Argentina, Oceanic, Equatorial Atlantic.
 Peracle diversa (Monterosato, 1875) - synonyms: Peracle apicifulva Meisenheimer, 1906, 
 Peracle bispinosa Pelseneer, 1888, Two-spine pteropod. Distribution: Florida, Bermuda, Cuba, Argentina, Mediterranean. Length: 4 mm.
 Peracle moluccensis Tesch, 1903 - Distribution: Panama, Brazil, British Isles, Oceanic. Length: 3 mm.
 Peracle philiporum (R. W. Gilmer, 1990) - Distribution: Bahamas. Length: 4.5 mm.
 Peracle reticulata (d'Orbigny, 1836) - Reticulate pteropod. Distribution: Oceanic, Florida, Texas; Mediterranean. Length: 6 mm. Description: the shell, which shows a hexagonal pattern, is rather heavy and compels this little animal to flap continuously to keep afloat. Table 4, figure 2
 Peracle triacantha (P. Fischer, 1882) - Distribution: Oceanic, Cuba, Bermuda, Venezuela, Mediterranean. Length: 5 mm
 Peracle valdiviae Meisenheimer 1905 - Distribution: Oceanic, Argentina. Length: 5 mm.

References

Peracle bispinosa is not synonyms of Peracle diversa. It is quite a different species!
The reference for synonyms of Peracle diversa and Peracle apicifulva is : Giovine F. (1988). "The genus Peracle in the Mediterranean (Heterobranchia: Peraclidae)". La Conchiglia 20(226-227): 22-24, 5 figs.

Further reading 
 Giovine F. (1988). "The genus Peracle in the Mediterranean (Heterobranchia: Peraclidae)". La Conchiglia 20(226-227): 22-24, 5 figs.